is a Japanese rail line operated by Nishi-Nippon Railroad (Nishitetsu) that connects Chikushino City and Dazaifu City in Fukuoka Prefecture.

History
The Dazaifu Horse Tramway Co. opened a 915mm gauge line from Futsukaichi to Dazaifu in 1902, and introduced steam locomotion on the line in 1913.

In 1927 the line was electrified at 1500 VDC and converted to 1435mm gauge, and was taken over by the Kyushu Railway Co. in 1934.

In 1942 the Kyushu Railway Co merged with the Kyushu Electric Railway Co., becoming the Nishi-Nippon (translates as West Japan) Railway Co.

Stations

References
This article incorporates material from the corresponding article in the Japanese Wikipedia

Rail transport in Fukuoka Prefecture
Dazaifu, Fukuoka